The 2nd APAN Star Awards was held on November 16, 2013 at the Hall of Jeongsimhwa International Cultural Center, Chungnam National University in Daejeon, hosted by T-ara's Park So-yeon and Lee Hwi-jae. First held in 2012, the annual awards ceremony recognizes the excellence in South Korea's television. The nominees were chosen from 75 Korean dramas that aired from November 1, 2012 to September 30, 2013.

The highest honor of the ceremony, Grand Prize (Daesang), was awarded to the actress Song Hye-kyo of the drama series That Winter, the Wind Blows.

Nominations and winners

Winners are listed first, highlighted in boldface, and indicated with a dagger.

References

External links
 

APAN
APAN Star Awards
APAN Star Awards